Sant Quirze, Catalan for Saint Cyriacus, may refer to:

Sant Quirze de Besora, municipality in the comarca of Osona
Sant Quirze de Colera, Benedictine monastery in Rabós
Sant Quirze del Vallès, town in the comarca of the Vallès Occidental
Sant Quirze Safaja, municipality in the comarca of the Vallès Oriental